The Earl and Darielle Linehan Concert Hall, previously known as the UMBC Concert Hall is the main theater of the University of Maryland, Baltimore County campus in Baltimore, Maryland. The theater is located in the Performing Arts and Humanities Building, the university's home for Ancient Studies, Dance, English, Music, Philosophy, and Theatre departments. The theater is the designated concert hall for the university's symphony orchestra and other ensembles.

Construction began in 2012 and was completed in the fall of 2014. The concert hall provides space for an orchestra, stage, and seating up to 375 individuals.

Awards

Along with the rest of the Performing Arts and Humanities Building, the Concert Hall was issued LEED silver status by the U.S. Green Building Council (USGBC).

In addition, the building was giver the Higher Education Design Award by the American Institute of Architects Baltimore Chapter.

References

University of Maryland, Baltimore County
Music venues in Baltimore
Tourist attractions in Baltimore